Manzanita is a North American shrub, common name for many species of the genus Arctostaphylos. 

Manzanita may also refer to:
 Crataegus mexicana (Mexican hawthorn), known in Spanish as manzanita or tejocote
 Malvaviscus arboreus (wax mallow, Turk's cap), known in Mexico as manzanita and manzanita de pollo
 Muntingia calabura  (Jamaica cherry), known in the Philippines and Guam as manzanita or mansanita
 Ziziphus jujuba and Ziziphus mauritiana (Jujube), known in the Philippines as manzanita or mansanita

Geography
 Manzanita, San Diego County, California, an unincorporated community
 Manzanita, Oregon, a town
 Manzanita, Bainbridge Island, Washington
 Manzanita Village, a residence hall at University of California, Santa Barbara

Music
 Manzanita (singer), Spanish singer
 Manzanita (Mia Doi Todd album), 2005
 Manzanita (Tony Rice album), 1979

Other
 Manzanita, Manzana verde, an alcoholic beverage